Crimson/Red is the tenth studio album by English pop band Prefab Sprout, although for this album "Prefab Sprout" consists entirely of singer/songwriter Paddy McAloon, who writes, sings and plays every note on the album. Crimson/Red was released in the United Kingdom by Icebreaker Records and Kitchenware Records on 7 October 2013. The album title is a reference to artist Mark Rothko.

Critical reception

In Mojo magazine, critic Danny Eccleston called Crimson/Red "the welcome return of Durham's song-craftsman supreme". The Observers Phil Mongredien praised the album as "charming, articulate and urbane" (a lyric from "Devil Came a Calling"). Four-star ratings appeared in both The Independent and The Times, with the former describing Crimson/Red as a "lovely album from a true one-off".

David Jeffries of AllMusic said, "The music throughout is just as beautiful and bold as the lyrics", with "immaculate production and an overall classic album flow".

Commercial reception

Crimson/Red was a chart success for Prefab Sprout. The album debuted at No. 15 in the UK Albums Chart, giving the band their highest-charting record since Andromeda Heights in 1997.

Crimson/Red debuted at No. 10 in Sweden and No. 21 in Norway, giving the band their second-highest chart positions ever in both countries. In its second week on the Norwegian charts, "Crimson/Red" climbed to No. 7, an all-time high for the band in Norway.

In Ireland, the album debuted at No. 40 (and No. 9 on the indie chart). In Germany, the album debuted at No. 42, making it Prefab Sprout's highest-charting album there.

Crimson/Red also charted in the Flanders region of Belgium (No. 83) and in Switzerland (No. 92).

Track listing
All songs written by Paddy McAloon.

 "The Best Jewel Thief in the World"
 "List of Impossible Things"
 "Adolescence"
 "Grief Built the Taj Mahal"
 "Devil Came a Calling"
 "Billy"
 "The Dreamer"
 "The Songs of Danny Galway"
 "The Old Magician"
 "Mysterious"

References

Prefab Sprout albums
2013 albums